Alfonso Calzolari (30 April 1887 - 7 February 1983)  was an Italian professional road racing cyclist. Calzolari was born in Vergato. The highlight of his career was his overall win in the 1914 Giro d'Italia.

External links
 

1887 births
1983 deaths
Sportspeople from the Metropolitan City of Bologna
Italian male cyclists
Giro d'Italia winners
Cyclists from Emilia-Romagna